Pahlavani is an extinct variety of Persian that was spoken in Afghanistan.

References

Eastern Persian dialects in Afghanistan